In the Dark is an American crime drama television series, created by Corinne Kingsbury for The CW, which debuted as a mid-season entry during the 2018–19 television season.

On January 30, 2018, The CW ordered the show to pilot, with Michael Showalter set to direct. In May 2018, the show received a series order. The series premiered on April 4, 2019. In April 2019, the series was renewed for a second season that premiered on April 16, 2020. In January 2020, The CW renewed the series for a third season which premiered on June 23, 2021. In February 2021, the series was renewed for a fourth season which premiered on June 6, 2022. In May 2022, it was announced that the fourth season will be its last.

Premise
An irreverent blind woman in her twenties, Murphy, drifts through life in a drunken haze. She has only two friends—Jess, her understanding roommate, and Tyson, a teenage drug-dealer who saved her from a violent mugging. Out for a walk with her guide dog, Pretzel, she stumbles upon a corpse that must be Tyson's, but it disappears before the police arrive. When they do not seem inclined to investigate, Murphy clings onto the only thing that can keep her together: figuring out what happened to her friend. She resolves to solve the murder herself, while also managing her colorful dating life and the job she hates at "Guiding Hope", a school run by her parents for training guide dogs. After falling for Max, who is secretly associated with the drug kingpin that employed Tyson, Murphy gets dragged into criminal activity.

Cast and characters

Overview

Main
 Perry Mattfeld as Murphy Mason, a young woman in her 20s who has been totally blind since age 14 from retinitis pigmentosa. Her blindness, introverted personality, and self-destructive lifestyle make her unwelcoming to most people. When a friend is murdered, she finds a new purpose in trying to find his killer and soon becomes involved in criminal activities.
 Rich Sommer as Dean Riley (seasons 1–2), a Chicago PD detective who sympathizes with Murphy, given that his daughter Chloe is also blind.
 Brooke Markham as Jess Damon (seasons 1–3), a veterinarian at Guiding Hope and Murphy's roommate and best friend who also assists her as an informal aide at times.
 Casey Deidrick as Max Parish, a food truck owner and associate of Darnell who becomes attracted to Murphy.
 Keston John as Darnell James, a local gang leader and Tyson's cousin, to whom Murphy turns for help finding him.
 Morgan Krantz as Felix Bell, Murphy's colleague at Guiding Hope who becomes a trusted ally & later on in the series a trusted friend. 
 Thamela Mpumlwana as Tyson Parker (season 1; guest season 4), a teenager who saved Murphy from a violent mugging two years previously, and became her closest friend until his untimely death.
 Derek Webster as Hank Mason (season 1; guest season 2), Murphy's adoptive father and the co-owner of Guiding Hope.
 Kathleen York as Joy Mason (season 1; special guest seasons 2–4), Murphy's adoptive mother and the co-owner of Guiding Hope. Unlike Hank, she is less accepting of Murphy's poor life choices.
 Theodore Bhat as Josh Wallace (seasons 3–4; recurring season 2), an IRS-CI special agent who is starting to lose his eyesight. He eventually embarks on a hate-filled vendetta against Murphy after she uses and deceives him in trying to cover up her involvement in criminal activities.
 Matt Murray as Officer Gene Clemens (seasons 3–4; recurring season 2), originally Dean's partner on the police force, he is later promoted to head of a narcotics task force for Chicago PD.
 Marianne Rendón as Leslie Bell (season 4; recurring season 3), a lawyer and Felix’s sister.

Recurring

 Levi and Trip as Pretzel, Murphy's loyal guide dog.
 Humberly Gonzalez as Vanessa (season 1; guest season 2), Jess's ex-girlfriend.
 Calle Walton as Chloe Riley (seasons 1–2 & 4), Dean's daughter who is also blind and looks up to Murphy as a big sister.
 Saycon Sengbloh as Jules Becker (season 1; guest season 2), Dean's partner and Darnell's love interest.
 Leslie Silva as Rhonda Parker (season 1; guest season 4), Tyson's mother.
 Lindsey Broad as Chelsea (seasons 1–2 & 4), Murphy's bartender friend and Dean's love interest, then Felix's.
 Sammy Azero as Wesley Moreno (season 1)
 Nicki Micheaux as Nia Bailey (seasons 1–2), proprietor of a laundromat which serves as a front for her operations as a drug lord and money launderer.
 Ana Ayora as Det. Sarah Barnes (seasons 1 & 3-4), Max's confidential handler who later joins Gene's narcotics task force.
 Chris Perfetti as Ben (season 2), Chelsea's slacker brother hired by Felix as a receptionist at Guiding Hope.
 Natalie Liconti as Sterling Fuller (season 2), Sam's girlfriend who's secretly keeping an eye on Nia's money and drugs hidden at Guiding Hope.
 Cortni Vaughn Joyner as Sam (season 2, guest seasons 1, 3-4), Nia's henchwoman.
 Dewshane Williams as Trey (seasons 2–4)
 Alan Van Sprang as Keith Alper (seasons 2–3)
 Maurice Compte as Josiah (seasons 2–3)
 Kimberly Laferriere as Lauren (season 3)
 Aris Tyros as Beau (season 3)
 Claudia Jurt as Cindy (season 3)
 Stuart Hughes as Det. Miller (season 3, guest season 2)
 Joey Klein as Redford Long (season 3)
 Aiza Ntibarikure as Alex (season 3)
 Roma Maffia as Paula Romano (season 4)
 Dalmar Abuzeid as Navarro (season 4)
 Billy MacLellan as Reggie (season 4)
 Julie Khaner as Kate Simmons (season 4; guest season 3)
 Mimi Kennedy as Gran (season 4)
 Peter Outerbridge as Jimmy McKay (season 4)

Episodes

Series overview

Season 1 (2019)

Season 2 (2020)

Season 3 (2021)

Season 4 (2022)

Production

Development
The series was created by Corinne Kingsbury for The CW, to debut during the 2018–19 television season. On January 30, 2018, The CW officially ordered the pilot. The series was greenlit on May 11, 2018.

In the Dark is the first CW primetime series to carry Descriptive Video Service audio, though The CW, as a minor network, is not required to have any DVS provisions under the regulations for audio description for their affiliates, so the base of stations carrying that track is smaller than other networks where carriage of descriptive video is required. On January 10, 2019, The CW announced the premiere of the series on April 4 at 9 p.m. On April 24, 2019, The CW renewed the series for a second season, that was originally scheduled to premiere on May 28, 2020, however it was moved to premiere date on April 16, 2020. On January 7, 2020, the series was renewed for a third season which premiered on June 23, 2021. On February 3, 2021, The CW renewed the series for a fourth season which premiered on June 6, 2022. On May 12, 2022, The CW announced that the fourth season will be its last.

Casting
On March 2, 2018, it was announced that Perry Mattfeld had been cast in the protagonist role of Murphy in the series' pilot, along with Brooke Markham as Jess, Murphy's roommate and best friend, and Keston John as Darnell, a local drug dealer; followed on March 9 with Kathleen York as Joy, Murphy's mother, and Derek Webster as Hank, Joy's husband. Austin Nichols was cast as Dean, a cop with a blind daughter, on March 12. On May 16, 2018, The CW announced that the role of Dean had been recast; with Nichols thereafter replaced by Rich Sommer on July 13, 2018. On September 10, 2019, Matt Murray was cast in a recurring role for the second season.

The show received some criticism for casting a sighted actor to play a blind character. British actor James Moore, who plays a disabled character in the soap opera Emmerdale and has a disability himself, argued that disabled actors will always be better placed to play disabled roles due to their life experience. On review aggregator Rotten Tomatoes, critics worried that the "questionable treatment of physical handicaps may leave some viewers with a dim impression." During a panel discussion at the Television Critics Association press tour, executive producer Nicky Weinstock defended the choices, claiming that they initially auditioned blind actors, but ultimately cast Perry because she was the best actor for the role.

Filming
Filming on the pilot began on March 12, 2018, in Toronto, Ontario, Canada; and wrapped on March 28. Principal photography on season 1 began on August 8, 2018, and ended on December 21, 2018. Principal photography for the second season began on August 19, 2019, and ended on January 24, 2020, in Toronto and Cambridge, Ontario, Canada. Filming for the series' third season began on November 2, 2020, and concluded on April 21, 2021. Filming for the fourth season began on November 29, 2021, and concluded on May 31, 2022.

Broadcast
In the Dark premiered on The CW at 9:00 p.m. on April 4, 2019.

In Canada, the series premiered on April 4, 2019, on Bravo!. The series continues to be broadcast on the channel, which is now branded as CTV Drama Channel. In fall 2020, the second season was re-run on CTV 2 starting September 15.

Reception

Critical response
On review aggregator Rotten Tomatoes, the series holds an approval rating of 73% based on 15 reviews, with an average rating of 7.16/10. The website's critical consensus reads, "Perry Mattfield is compelling as an amateur sleuth In the Dark, although the series' recycling of mystery tropes and questionable treatment of physical handicaps may leave some viewers with a dim impression." On Metacritic, it has a weighted average score of 54 out of 100, based on 6 critics, indicating "mixed or average reviews".

Ratings

Season 1

Season 2

Season 3

Season 4

Notes

References

External links
 
 

2019 American television series debuts
2022 American television series endings
2010s American comedy-drama television series
2010s American crime drama television series
2010s American LGBT-related drama television series
2020s American comedy-drama television series
2020s American crime drama television series
2020s American LGBT-related drama television series
English-language television shows
Fictional blind characters
Television shows about blind people
Lesbian-related television shows
Television series by CBS Studios
Television series by Red Hour Productions
Television series by Warner Bros. Television Studios
Television shows filmed in Toronto
The CW original programming